Robert Gordon Kennedy (June 15, 1930 – December 18, 1998), was a Canadian ice hockey player with the East York Lyndhursts. He won a silver medal at the 1954 World Ice Hockey Championships in Stockholm, Sweden. He also played with the Stratford Kroehlers.

References

1930 births
1998 deaths
Stratford Kroehlers players
Canadian ice hockey centres
East York Lyndhursts players